Peter or Pete Knight may refer to:

Music
 Peter Knight (composer) (1917–1985), arranger and composer
 Peter Knight (folk musician) (born 1947), member of the group Steeleye Span
 Peter Knight (musician) (born 1965), Australian musician and composer

Sports
 Pete Knight (rodeo) (1903–1937), world champion rodeo bronc rider
 Peter Knight (footballer), midfielder for Oxford United F.C. from 1960 to 1964

Other
 Peter Knight (anti-abortion activist) (born 1954), Australian convicted of the murder of a security guard in a Melbourne abortion clinic
 Peter Knight (physicist) (born 1947), British physicist
 Peter A. Knight, the creator of the TV series Kröd Mändoon and the Flaming Sword of Fire
 Peter O. Knight (1865–1946), lawyer in Tampa, Florida
 William J. Knight (1929–2004), American test pilot, astronaut and politician nicknamed "Pete"